Benchill is a tram stop for Phase 3b of the Manchester Metrolink. It opened on 3 November 2014. It is on the Airport Line at the Brownley Road/Hollyhedge Road crossroads. A health centre and new sixth form college are also near the stop.

Services
Trams run every 12 minutes north to Victoria and south to Manchester Airport. Between 03:00 and 06:00, a service operates Deansgate-Castlefield and Manchester Airport every 20 minutes.

Ticket zones 
Benchill stop is located within Metrolink ticket zone 4.

References

External links

 Metrolink stop information
 Benchill area map
 Light Rail Transit Association
 Airport route map

Tram stops in Manchester